George Frederick Hose (3 September 1838 – 26 March 1922) was an Anglican clergyman, Bishop of Labuan and Sarawak from 1881 to 1909.

Hose was born on 3 September 1838 in Brunswick Place, Cambridge, the son of Frederick Hose, a clerk, and his wife, Mary Ann Knight. He was educated at St John's College, Cambridge, where he gained an MA and ordained in 1861. He began his career with curacies at Roxton and Marylebone. He was Chaplain of Malacca then Archdeacon of Singapore before his elevation to the episcopate.

In 1877, he promoted the founding of the Straits Asiatic Society, later the Malaysian Branch of the Royal Asiatic Society, and subsequently served as the society's president from 1878 to 1908.

He retired in 1909 and died on 26 March 1922. His son Edward Shaw Hose was a civil servant in Malaya and was also President of the Asiatic Society.

References

External links
 C. M. Turnbull, "Hose, George Frederick (1838–1922)", Oxford Dictionary of National Biography, Oxford University Press, 2004. (Accessed 4 November 2015)

1838 births
1922 deaths
Alumni of St John's College, Cambridge
Archdeacons of Singapore
20th-century Anglican bishops in Asia
Anglican bishops of Labuan and Sarawak
British expatriates in Malaysia
British chaplains
People from British Borneo
Anglican bishops of West Malaysia